Legionella hackeliae is a Gram-negative bacterium from the genus Legionella which was isolated from human lung aspirate in Pennsylvania.

References

External links
Type strain of Legionella hackeliae at BacDive -  the Bacterial Diversity Metadatabase

Legionellales
Bacteria described in 1985